Miss Universe Myanmar 2020 was the eighth Miss Universe Myanmar pageant was held on 30 December 2020 at Novotel Max Hotel, Yangon, Myanmar. Swe Zin Htet, Miss Universe Myanmar 2019 of Hpa-An crowned Thuzar Wint Lwin of Hakha her successor at the end of the event. The winner represented Myanmar at Miss Universe 2020 in Seminole Hard Rock Hotel & Casino in Hollywood, Florida, United States where she placed in the top 21 and won the Best National Costume award.

Results
Color keys

§ - Voted into the Top 6 by voting.

Awards

Special awards

Let Me Choose
The voting winner will be enter final top 6.

Best National Costume

Pageant

Judges

Contestants 
All 35 city titleholders have been crowned.

Note

References

External links 
 Miss Universe Myanmar official website

2020 in Myanmar
 
2020 beauty pageants
Beauty pageants in Myanmar